Thomas Wilkinson may refer to:

Clergy
Thomas Wilkinson (bishop of Brandon) (fl. 1929–1975), Anglican bishop in Canada
Thomas Wilkinson (bishop of Hexham and Newcastle) (1825–1909), English prelate of the Roman Catholic Church
Thomas Edward Wilkinson or Edward Wilkinson (1837–1914), Anglican bishop in Africa and Europe

Victoria Cross recipients
Thomas Wilkinson (VC 1855) (1831–1887), during the Crimean War
Thomas Wilkinson (VC 1942) (1898–1942), during the Second World War
Thomas Orde Lawder Wilkinson (1894–1916), during the First World War

Others
Thomas Wilkinson (Australian politician) (1799–1881), member of the Victorian Legislative Council, 1851–1853
Thomas Wilkinson (MP) (fl. 1512–1523), British Member of Parliament for Kingston upon Hull
Thomas Wilkinson (pirate), pirate convicted in Philadelphia, Pennsylvania in 1781
Thomas Wilkinson (sculptor) (1875–1950), British sculptor
Thomas Wilkinson, former guitarist of the American death metal band Immolation (band)
Tom Wilkinson (born 1948), British actor
Tom Wilkinson (Canadian football) (born 1943), quarterback
Tom Wilkinson (footballer), English former footballer

See also
 Thomas Wilkins (disambiguation)